The 2015–16 Dartmouth Big Green men's basketball team represented Dartmouth College during the 2015–16 NCAA Division I men's basketball season. The Big Green, led by sixth-year head coach Paul Cormier, played their home games at Leede Arena in Hanover, New Hampshire and were members of the Ivy League. The Big Green finished the season 10–18, 4–10 in Ivy League play to finish in sixth place.

On March 21, 2016 head coach Paul Cormier was fired. He finished at Dartmouth with a six-year record of 54–116. On April 25, the school hired David McLaughlin as head coach.

Previous season
The Big Green finished the 2014–15 season 14–15, 7–7 in Ivy League play to finish in fourth place. They were invited to the CollegeInsider.com Tournament, their first postseason appearance since 1959, where they lost in the first round to Canisius.

Departures

Recruiting

Recruiting class of 2016

Roster

Schedule

|-
!colspan=9 style="background:#00693E; color:#FFFFFF;"| Regular season

References

Dartmouth Big Green men's basketball seasons
Dartmouth
Dart
Dart